Orlu may refer to the following places:

 Orlu, Imo, city in Nigeria
 Orlu, Ariège, commune in France
 Orlu, Eure-et-Loir, commune in France